Mr. Billy Higgins is an album led by American jazz drummer Billy Higgins recorded in 1984 and first released on the Riza label.

Reception
The Allmusic review by Scott Yanow awarded the album 4 stars calling it "fresh, generally modal post-bop. Well worth picking up".

Track listing
 "Dance of the Clones" (William Henderson) - 9:03   
 "John Coltrane" (Bill Lee) - 12:15   
 "Morning Awakening" (Gary Bias) - 12:00   
 "Humility" (Bias) - 4:58   
 "East Side Stomp" (Bias) - 5:23

Personnel
Billy Higgins - drums
Gary Bias - soprano saxophone, alto saxophone, tenor saxophone
William Henderson - piano
Tony Dumas - bass

References 

Billy Higgins albums
1985 albums